"Quando quando quando" (or "Quando, Quando, Quando", ; "When, When, When") is an Italian pop song from 1962, in the bossa nova style, with music written by Tony Renis and lyrics by Alberto Testa. The song, originally recorded in two different versions by Tony Renis and Emilio Pericoli, competed in the Sanremo Music Festival in 1962, where it placed fourth, and later became a commercial success in Italy, topping the Musica e dischi singles chart. American entertainer Pat Boone, who recorded the song in 1962, sang the English lyrics written by Ervin Drake.

English-language versions 

The song has been used and remixed by many artists and in many different arrangements, including English pop singer Engelbert Humperdinck in 1968. In 2005, Michael Bublé performed the song as a duet with Nelly Furtado. There is an instrumental Latin version by Edgardo Cintron and The Tiempos Noventa Orchestra. The song was a 1962 Billboard Top 100 entry by Pat Boone.

Quando is the only Italian word normally retained in most English-language renditions of the song.

Pat Boone sang the starting piece in Italian but then carried on the rest of it in English, repeating every now and again some Italian words.
The Italian words sung by Boone are:
Dimmi quando tu verrai,
dimmi quando... quando... quando...
l'anno, il giorno e l'ora in cui
forse tu mi bacerai...

(in cui means when, or in which.)

Notable cover versions
 Bobby Curtola, Canadian singer, charted with it in 1967 (#10)
 Engelbert Humperdinck, English singer, in 1968. This version was remixed into a dance version in 1999, which charted at number 40.

References

External links
 

1962 songs
1967 singles
1968 singles
Italian songs
Portuguese songs
Tony Renis songs
Pat Boone songs
Connie Francis songs
Michael Bublé songs
Nelly Furtado songs
Caterina Valente songs
Sanremo Music Festival songs
Songs with lyrics by Alberto Testa (lyricist)
Songs with music by Tony Renis
Number-one singles in Italy
Engelbert Humperdinck songs
Emilio Pericoli songs